Maa Inti Mahalakshmi is a 1959 Indian Telugu-language family drama film directed by G. Ramineedu and written by K. Pratyagatma. It stars Jamuna and Haranath. The was produced by Parvathaneni Gangadhara Rao and the music was composed by G. Aswathama, while M. K. Raja and Akkineni Sanjeevi handled cinematography and editing respectively. It was the first Telugu film to be entirely shot in Hyderabad.

Cast 

 Jamuna  
 Haranath
 Girija
 P. Bhanumathi
 Gummadi
 Ramana Reddy
 Perumallu
 Suryakala
 Lakshmi Kantamma
 Aadoni Lakshmi

Soundtrack 
Music is composed by G. Aswathama, and released on HMV label.

Awards
National Film Awards
National Film Award for Best Feature Film in Telugu - 1959

References

External links 
 

1959 films
1950s Telugu-language films
Films scored by Ashwatthama